Anand Rao Gaekwad was the seventh Maharaja of Baroda State reigning from 1800 to 1819 with the regents of Fateh Singh II and Sayaji Rao Gaekwad. He became Maharaja of Baroda after the death of Govind Rao Gaekwad.

Death
He died in 1819 and was succeeded by Sayaji Rao II Gaekwad as the new ruler of Baroda.

See also
Gaekwad dynasty

References

External links
 Official Website of the Gaekwads of Baroda

Year of birth missing
1819 deaths
Maharajas of Vadodara
Hindu monarchs
Indian royalty
Indian military leaders